Hugo Vallarino (born 27 March 1916) was an Argentine weightlifter. He competed in the men's heavyweight event at the 1948 Summer Olympics.

References

External links
 

1916 births
Possibly living people
Argentine male weightlifters
Olympic weightlifters of Argentina
Weightlifters at the 1948 Summer Olympics
Place of birth missing